The Backyard Observatory Supernova Search (BOSS) is conducted by astronomers from Australia and New Zealand since mid 2008 to search for new supernovae in the southern hemisphere. In 2022 the group won the Astronomical Society of Australia's Page Medal for having found around 200 confirmed supernovas.

List of discoveries

References

Amateur astronomy organizations
Variable stars
Scientific organizations established in 2008